A Deed of Grant in Trust (DOGIT) is the name for a system of community-level land trust established in Queensland to administer former Aboriginal reserves and missions. They came about through the enactment by the Queensland Government of the Community Services (Torres Strait) Act 1984 and Community Services (Aborigines) Act 1984 in 1984, allowing community councils to be created to own and administer former Aboriginal reserves or missions under a Deed of Grant in Trust). The trusts are governed by local representatives who are elected every three years to councils called Incorporated Aboriginal Councils. These councils have the power to pass by-laws, appoint police for the community, and are responsible for maintaining housing and infrastructure, running the Community Development Employment Program and issuing hunting, fishing and camping permits. As such, they work much like a local government, but are different in character as they own the land they administer on behalf of the community. 

Most of the Torres Strait Islands entered DOGIT arrangements in October 1985, with the notable exception of Mer Island, which became the subject of the Mabo No.1 (1988) and No.2 (1992) cases. The first Aboriginal community to receive a DOGIT was Hope Vale on 27 July 1986. In the years following, many DOGIT communities were established—mostly in the Cape York Peninsula, Torres Strait Islands and Carpentaria regions. The Local Government (Community Government Areas) Act 2004 extended to community councils many of the provisions and benefits of the Local Government Act 1993 normally enjoyed by shire councils.

From 1 January 2015, some trustees, namely those classified as "urban" or "future urban" (numbering 34) are able to convert parts of the collective title to either Aboriginal freehold or Torres Strait Islander freehold title.

Communities

The following is a list of DOGIT communities in Queensland.

See also
Indigenous land rights in Australia

References

External links
 Aboriginal Law Bulletin (1984)
 Public Health Law and Indigenous Health Project (2002)

Native title in Australia
Government of Queensland